Buddhism in Finland represents a very small percentage of that nation's religious practices. In 2015 there were estimated less than 10 000 followers of Buddhism in Finland. It's, however, hard to evaluate the exact amount of the Buddhists as many donations officially belong to a religious congregation and some of them are registered as associations rather than congregations. Furthermore, it's hard to say how many people are born into the religion and how many converts there are. 

The world's northernmost stupa, and the only one in Finland, is located in Siikainen.

There are Buddhist centers and temples throughout the country. In total there are around 40 different organisations. For example Diamond Way Buddhism Finland has four centers in Helsinki, Lahti, Tampere and Turku. The very first Buddhist monastery, Liên Tâm Monastery, in Finland was inaugurated in Moisio in 2015. Another monastery was founded in Kuopio in 2019.

Finnish Buddhist Union is loosely organized umbrella organisation of different Buddhist associations and congregations in Finland.

References

External links
 Buddhism and Nordland
 The Early History of Buddhism in Finland Parts I & II by Alpo Ratia
Buddhalaisuus.fi

Fin 
Bud

Buddhism in Finland